Waxham is a village and former civil parish, now in the parish of Sea Palling, in the North Norfolk district, in the county of Norfolk, England. It lies on the north-east coast of the county. Buildings in the village include Waxham Hall, the 14th-century St. John's Church and the 16th-century Waxham Great Barn. Waxham Hall is reputedly haunted by the ghosts of six members of the Brograve family, all of whom died in battle. It is said that an 18th-century owner of the house once invited them all to dinner. Waxham Great Barn (Listed Grade 1) built about 1570, at 178 feet long is one of the largest barns of its age in the country. It has recently been restored and opened to the public. The village has an extensive beach backed by dunes. Many migrant birds pass through the area in spring and autumn and common cranes feed in fields near the village. In 1931 the parish had a population of 84.

History 
The villages name origin is uncertain 'Waegstan's homestead/village', or 'watch-stone homestead/village'. On 1 April 1935 the parish was abolished and merged with Palling.

Notable people
 Anne Townshend, benefactor, was born here in 1573.
 Henry Woodhouse (MP) (1545-1634)

Lordship of Waxham
The Lordship of Waxham has a rich documented history that covers many centuries. Most feudal titles were created after the Norman invasion of England in 1066, but lordships pre-date this. It was held by St Benet's Abbey and Alan the Earl of Richmond a Breton noble who fought for Stephen of England. The present-day holder of the Lordship of Waxham is Stephen David Young, a businessman originally from Buckinghamshire. This is a Feudal Lordship, or honour or dignity, rather than a peerage. The Lord of the Manor can still call a Court Leet, these generally had a jury formed from the freehold tenants or freeman of the Manor. The jury's role was similar to that of the doomsmen of the Anglo-Saxon period and included electing the officers (other than the steward who was appointed by the Lord), to bring matters to the attention of the court and deciding on them. The officers of the Court Leet could include some or all of the following: the Steward, the chief official of the Lord of the Manor, and judge; and the Manor Bailiff, who summoned the jury and, if necessary performed arrests, as well as generally supervising Court matters.

In film
Whistle and I'll Come to You (Omnibus), 1968, was partially filmed at Waxham.

Further reading

References

External links

Official website of Sea Palling and Waxham
BBC site on restoration of the barn

Villages in Norfolk
North Norfolk
Populated coastal places in Norfolk
Former civil parishes in Norfolk
Beaches of Norfolk